Vanja Plisnić (born July 28, 1980) is a Serbian former professional basketball player. He is a 2,05 m tall power forward.

With FMP Železnik Plisnić won the 2003 Serbia & Montenegro National Cup and the 2004 Adriatic League. He has been member of the Yugoslav Under-20 National Team, played at the 2000 European Under-20 Championship. He was member of the Serbia & Montenegro University National Team, won the gold medal at the 2003 Summer Universiade and bronze medal at the 2005 Summer Universiade .

References

External links
 Vanja Plisnić at adriaticbasket.com
 Vanja Plisnić at euroleague.com
 Vanja Plisnić at eurobasket.com
 Vanja Plisnić at TBLStat.net

1980 births
Living people
ABA League players
BC Nizhny Novgorod players
BC Oostende players
Bosnia and Herzegovina expatriate basketball people in Serbia
Dinamo Sassari players
KK FMP (1991–2011) players
KK Novi Sad players
KK Hemofarm players
KK Vojvodina Srbijagas players
Pallacanestro Biella players
PBC Ural Great players
Sportspeople from Zenica
Power forwards (basketball)
BKK Radnički players
Serbian expatriate basketball people in Belgium
Serbian expatriate basketball people in Italy
Serbian expatriate basketball people in Russia
Serbian expatriate basketball people in Turkey
Serbian men's basketball players
Serbs of Bosnia and Herzegovina
TED Ankara Kolejliler players
Torku Konyaspor B.K. players
Universiade medalists in basketball
Universiade gold medalists for Serbia and Montenegro
Universiade silver medalists for Serbia and Montenegro
Universiade bronze medalists for Serbia and Montenegro
Medalists at the 1999 Summer Universiade
Medalists at the 2003 Summer Universiade
Medalists at the 2005 Summer Universiade